Meganne Young (born 22 March 1990) is a South African actress and director. She is best known for her roles in The Kissing Booth franchise and the Starz series Black Sails.

Early life
Young was born in Cape Town to a South African father and an Australian mother. She spent her childhood moving around, with stints in Nigeria, Switzerland, and Sri Lanka where she took the International Baccalaureate at the Overseas School of Colombo. She pursued at an Advanced Diploma in Acting at the CityVarsity Cape Town campus, completing in 2011, before going on to graduate from the Guildford School of Acting in England as a part-time distance learner in 2014.

Career
Young began her career in theatre and short films, earning 48 Hour Film and Fleur du Cap Theatre Award nominations for her work. She appeared in the British film Eye in the Sky. She landed her first major onscreen role as Abigail Ashe in Starz series Black Sails. She also made guest appearances in season 14 of Supernatural and in Legends of Tomorrow.

In 2018, she landed the role of Rachel in the Netflix original film The Kissing Booth. Young went on to reprise her role in the films' sequels, The Kissing Booth 2 (2020) and The Kissing Booth 3'' (2021).

Filmography

Film

Television

Stage

Awards and nominations

References

External links
 

Living people
1990 births
21st-century South African actresses
Alumni of the Guildford School of Acting
South African people of Australian descent
South African women film directors
South African theatre directors